2001 Emperor's Cup Final was the 81st final of the Emperor's Cup competition. The final was played at National Stadium in Tokyo on January 1, 2002. Shimizu S-Pulse won the championship.

Overview
Shimizu S-Pulse won their 1st title, by defeating Cerezo Osaka 3–2 with Alessandro Santos, Ryuzo Morioka and Baron goal.

Match details

See also
2001 Emperor's Cup

References

Emperor's Cup
2001 in Japanese football
Shimizu S-Pulse matches
Cerezo Osaka matches